Dawes is an American folk rock band from Los Angeles, California, composed of brothers Taylor (guitars and vocals) and Griffin Goldsmith (drums), along with Wylie Gelber (bass) and Lee Pardini (keyboards).

History

Dawes was formed from the band Simon Dawes after the departure of co-songwriter Blake Mills, subsequently abandoning a post-punk sound in favor of folk rock. Dawes has been described as having a Laurel Canyon sound derived from artists such as Crosby, Stills, and Nash, Joni Mitchell and Neil Young.

At the invitation of producer Jonathan Wilson, the band joined a local informal jam session that included Conor Oberst, The Black Crowes's Chris Robinson, and Benmont Tench. The band recorded their debut album, North Hills, in Laurel Canyon in a live setting to analog tape, resulting in a sound that Rolling Stone magazine called "authentically vintage". Wilco multi-instrumentalist Pat Sansone is also credited with appearing on the release.

The band made their television debut on The Late Late Show with Craig Ferguson on April 14, 2010. Dawes released their second album, Nothing Is Wrong, on June 7, 2011, and toured the US co-headlining with Blitzen Trapper. Original keyboardist Tay Strathairn did not appear on Nothing Is Wrong due to other commitments and was temporarily replaced by Alex Casnoff. Strathairn returned to the band in late 2010. Dawes played alongside Jackson Browne at the Occupy Wall Street event in Zuccotti Park, on December 1, 2011. The band also appeared as themselves on the February 7, 2012 episode of the NBC television series Parenthood.

In February 2013, the band released the single "From a Window Seat" from the 2013 album Stories Don't End on Red General Catalog and their own Hub Records.

The song "Just Beneath the Surface" from Stories Don't End was featured in the episode "Independent Movie" of the animated series American Dad!

On April 22, 2015, Dawes performed on The Late Show with David Letterman, paying tribute to Warren Zevon with their cover of "Desparados Under the Eaves".  They also performed the song "Things Happen" on the show.

Duane Betts joined the band as a member of their touring ensemble in June 2015, performing as an auxiliary guitarist. Taylor and Duane alternated playing lead guitar on songs. The band's fourth album, All Your Favorite Bands, was released on June 2, 2015. Three months later, the departure of keyboardist Tay Strathairn was announced in a Facebook post. Lee Pardini began playing keyboards on the band's winter 2015/2016 tour and became a permanent member of the band in July 2016. Betts also left the touring ensemble, and was replaced by guitarist Trevor Menear.

Dawes' fifth album, We're All Gonna Die, was released on September 16, 2016, on HUB Records. The record marked a distinct change of style, building on the band's previous Laurel Canyon folk rock sound with a sonic twist, adding in more synthesized keyboard sounds, heavier bass, and an overall different sound for the group (while still staying true to their roots). We're All Gonna Die was produced by former founding member of Simon Dawes, Blake Mills. In November 2016, they announced their "An Evening with Dawes" tour, which began in January 2017. The "Evening With" tour is distinct from past tours because, instead of having an opening act, they perform 2–3 hour shows with a small intermission.

Passwords, Dawes' sixth studio album, released on June 22, 2018. The album saw the return of producer Jonathan Wilson, and is "for and about the modern age: the relationships that fill it, the politics that divide it, and the small victories and big losses that give it shape." The band launched a marketing campaign for the album that encouraged fans to search for "passwords" posted throughout the Internet. Once a password was found, it could be entered onto a page of the band's official website where each part of the password represented a musical note. When entered correctly, these musical notes played various musical refrains from Dawes songs and unlocked exclusive content, including the singles "Never Gonna Say Goodbye" and "Telescope," as well as a Spotify playlist curated by Griffin Goldsmith. In 2020, the members of Dawes played a few shows with Phil Lesh of the Grateful Dead after connecting through Jason Crosby.

On July 22, 2020, Dawes announced their seventh studio album, Good Luck With Whatever, released on October 2 via Rounder Records. In conjunction with the announcement, the band released their first single from the album, "Who Do You Think You're Talking To?"

On May 6, 2022, Dawes announced their eighth album, Misadventures of Doomscroller. It was released July 22 via Rounder Records. The first single was "Someone Else's Cafe / Doomscroller Tries to Relax."

Discography

Albums

Studio albums

Live albums

EPs

Singles

As lead artist

As featured artist

Other appearances

Notes

References

External links

 Dawes website
 Dawes Daytrotter session
 Dawes live audio recordings 

American indie folk groups
Folk rock groups from California
Rock music groups from California
Musical groups from Los Angeles
ATO Records artists
Musical quartets
Musical groups established in 2009
Loose Music artists
Mercury Records artists
Record Collection artists